Tripping the Light Fantastic is the debut studio album by the American rock band Lit. It was released on April 1, 1997, on Malicious Vinyl Records. The band eventually left the record label owning the rights to Tripping The Light Fantastic, and it was reissued on the band's own label, Dirty Martini, with distribution through their then label RCA Records.

Style
Tripping the Light Fantastic is a heavy and aggressive album that incorporates elements of heavy metal, punk rock and grunge.

Critical reception
The Los Angeles Times called the album a "skillful but uninspired grunge rehash." The Encyclopedia of Popular Music called it "excellent," writing that it "dynamically fused alternative rock and power pop styles to great effect."

Track listing

Personnel
Lit
A. Jay Popoff - lead vocals
Jeremy Popoff - guitar, backing vocals
Kevin Baldes - bass
Allen Shellenberger - drums

Additional musicians
 Derek Dee – cello (6, 9)
 Niels "Bye" Nielsen – orchestra (9)
 Satnam Singh Ramgotra – tabla (5)
 A.J. Martin – DJ (11)

Production
Produced by Lit and Matt Gruber
Recorded and mixed by Matt Gruber
Recorded in Los Angeles at Grand Master Hollywood Sound
Mixed at Scream and Hollywood Sound
2nd engineers: Todd Burke, Bryan Davis, Josh Turner and Ralph Cacciutti
2nd mix engineers: Ryan Boesch and Doug Trantow
Mastered by Eddy Schreyer at Oasis
Art design and layout: Ng Smimizu for Grip Grafix
Tray card collage: Priscila Bara
Photography: Jeff Bender
All concepts: Lit
Management: Ruta E. Sepetys
A&R: Craig McDonald
Legal: Scott Harrington, Manatt Phelps & Phillips
Additional musicians: Satnam Singh Ramgotra (tabla on "Habib"), Derek Dee (cello on "Explode" and "Dozer"), Niels Bye Nielsen (orchestra on "Dozer"), A.J. Martin (D.J. on "Cadillac")

References

Lit (band) albums
Grunge albums
Punk rock albums by American artists
Heavy metal albums by American artists
1997 debut albums